Laredo Petroleum, Inc. is an American company engaged in hydrocarbon exploration incorporated in Delaware with its principal operational headquarters located in Tulsa, Oklahoma.

Laredo Petroleum has no connection or association with Laredo Oil, traded on the over-the-counter market.

As of December 31, 2020, the company had  of estimated proved reserves, of which 24% was petroleum, 36% was natural-gas condensates and 39% was natural gas. All of these reserves were in the Permian Basin, where the company controlled 133,199 net acres.

The company drills almost all of its wells using what it calls the "earth model", which it claims increases efficiency.

History
The company was founded in October 2006 by Randy A. Foutch.

In July 2011, the company acquired Broad Oak Energy in a $1 billion transaction, which expanded its presence in the Permian Basin and the Cline Shale.

On December 20, 2011, the company became a public company via an initial public offering.

In May 2013, the company sold its assets in the Anadarko Basin in western Oklahoma and Texas to affiliates of EnerVest Ltd for $438 million to raise capital for its drilling activities in the Permian Basin.

In July 2016, the company acquired additional acreage in the Midland Basin for $125 million.

In 2017, the company sold its interest in the Medallion Pipeline.

See also
 List of oil exploration and production companies

References

External links

2006 establishments in Oklahoma
2011 initial public offerings
American companies established in 2011
Companies based in Tulsa, Oklahoma
Companies listed on the New York Stock Exchange
Energy companies established in 2006
Non-renewable resource companies established in 2006
Oil companies of the United States
Petroleum in Oklahoma